The Mediomatrici (Gaulish: *Medio-māteres) were according to Caesar a Gaulish tribe at the frontier to the Belgicae dwelling in the present-day regions Lorraine, Upper Moselle during the Iron Age and the Roman period.

Name 
They are mentioned as Mediomatricorum and Mediomatricis (dat.) by Caesar (mid-1st c. BC), Mediomatrikoì (Μεδιοματρικοὶ ) by Strabo (early 1st c. AD), Mediomatrici  by Pliny (1st c. AD), Mediomatricos (acc.) by Tacitus (early 2nd c. AD), and as Mediomátrikes (Μεδιομάτρικες) by Ptolemy (2nd c. AD).

The ethnonym Mediomatrici is a latinized form of the Gaulish *Medio-māteres, which literally means 'Middle-Mothers'. It is formed with the stem medio- ('in the middle, central') attached to a plural form of mātīr ('mother'). The name could be interpreted as meaning 'those who live between the Matrona (Marne) and the Matra rivers' (i.e. the mother-rivers), or possibly as the 'Mothers of the Middle-World' (i.e. between the heaven and the underworld).

The city of Metz, attested ca. 400 AD as civitas Mediomatricorum ('civitas of the Mediomatrici'), is named after the Celtic tribe.

Geography

Territory 

The territory of the Mediomatrici comprised the upper basins of the rivers Maas, Moselle and Saar, and extended eastwards as far as the Rhine in the mid-first century BC. Ptolemy places them south of the Treviri, between the Remi and the Leuci.

Settlements 
Their chief town was Divodurum ('place of the gods, divine enclosure'), mentioned by Tacitus in the early 1st century AD.

A secondary agglomeration, whose original name is unknown, was located in Bliesbruck, in the eastern part of their civitas.

History
During the Gallic Wars (58–50 BC), the Mediomatrici sent 5,000 men to support Vercingetorix who was besieged in Alesia in 52. In 69–70 of the Common Era, their capital Divodurum was sacked by the armies of Vitellius, and 4,000 of its inhabitants massacred. The Romanization of the Metromatrici was apparently slower compared to their neighbours the Treviri.

Elements of the Mediomatrici may have settled near Novara, in northwestern Italy, where place-names allude to their presence, such as Mezzomerico, attested as Mediomadrigo in 980.

References

Footnotes

Bibliography 

 
 
 
 
 
 
 
 

 
Historical Celtic peoples
Gauls
Tribes of pre-Roman Gaul
Belgae